Aklanon (Akeanon), also known as Bisaya/Binisaya nga Aklanon/Inaklanon or simply Aklan, is an Austronesian language of the Bisayan subgroup spoken by the Aklanon people in the province of Aklan on the island of Panay in the Philippines. Its unique feature among other Bisayan languages is the close-mid back unrounded vowel  occurring as part of diphthongs and traditionally written with the letter  such as in the autonyms Akean and Akeanon. However, this phoneme is also present in other but geographically scattered and distant Philippine languages, namely Itbayat, Isneg, Manobo, Samal and Sagada.

The Malaynon dialect is 93% lexically similar to Aklanon and has retained the "l" sounds, which elsewhere are often pronounced as "r".

Ibayjanon (Ibajaynon) dialect has shortened versions of Aklanon words.

Phonology
Aklanon has 21 phonemes. There are 17 consonants: p, t, k, b, d, g, m, n, ng, s, h, l, r, w, y, the glottal stop , and the voiced velar fricative . There are six vowels: the three native vowels i, a, and u, which are typical for a Bisayan vowel inventory, the additional e and o for loanwords and common nouns, and a distinct phoneme argued by Zorc (2005) to be a close-mid back unrounded vowel .

Vowels

Consonants

Common phrases

Philippine national proverb
 
 Akeanon: 
 Malaynon: 
 
 English: He who does not look back where he came from, will never reach his destination.

Numbers

Literature 
Note: All these poems were written by Melchor F. Cichon, an Aklanon poet.

"Ambeth". Philippine Panorama, August 14, 1994.
"Emergency Room". The Aklan Reporter, December 7, 1994, p. 10
"Eva, Si Adan!" (Finalist Sa Unang Premyo Openiano A. Italia Competition, January 1993, Duenas, Iloilo)
"Ham-at Madueom Ro Gabii Inay?" Philippine Panorama, March 27, 1994, p. 29. (First Aklanon poem published in the Philippine Panorama), also in The Aklan Reporter, April 6, 1994, p. 8.
"Hin-uno Pa". The Aklan Reporter, February 23, 1994, p. 8. Also in Ani December 1993, p. 44
"Inay". Philippine Collegian, October 4, 1973, p. 3 (First Aklanon poem in the Philippine Collegian)
"Limog sa Idaeom". Ani December 1993, p. 48
"Mamunit Ako Inay". The Aklan Reporter, December 28, 1994, p. 10
"Manog-Uling". The Aklan Reporter July 29, 1992, p. 9. Also in Ani December 1993, p. 50
"Owa't Kaso", Saeamat. Mantala 3:97  2000
"Ro Bantay". The Aklan Reporter, September 6, 1995, p. 7
"Competition", March 13, 1998, UPV Auditorium, Iloilo City
"Sa Pilapil It Tangke". Ani December 1994, p. 46
"Toto, Pumailaya Ka". Pagbutlak (First Aklanon in Pagbutlak)
"Welga". Mantala 3:99  2000

Learning resources
"Five-language Dictionary (Panay Island)" , 2003  Roman dela Cruz Kalibo, Aklan
"A grammar of Aklan". 1971. Chai, Nemia Melgarejo. Ann Arbor: UMI. (Doctoral dissertation, Philadelphia: University of Pennsylvania; xiv+229pp.)
"Aklanon". 1995. Zorc, R. David. In Darrell T. Tryon (ed.), Comparative Austronesian dictionary: an introduction to Austronesian studies: Berlin and New York: Mouton de Gruyter. pp. 359–362.
"A study of the Aklanon dialect" / Authors: Beato A. de la Cruz, R. David Paul Zorc, Vicente Salas Reyes, & Nicolas L. Prado; Public Domain 1968-1969; Kalibo, Aklan
 "Vol.I Grammar" Smithsonian Institution Libraries call# 39088000201871 (Full text on ERIC)
 'Vol.II A Dictionary (of root words and derivations) Aklanon to English" Smithsonian Institution Libraries call# 39088000201889 (Full text on ERIC)
"The functions of ‘hay’ in Aklanon narrative discourse". 1990. Brainard, Sherri and Poul Jensen.
"A preliminary study of demonstratives in Aklanon narratives". 1992. Jensen, Kristine and Rodolfo R. Barlaan.

References

External links

Learning Aklanon
Aklanon Wordlist at the Austronesian Basic Vocabulary Database
Aklanon proverbs

Languages of Aklan
Languages of Capiz
Visayan languages